Whitecap Dakota First Nation is a Dakota First Nations band government whose reserve  is located  south of Saskatoon, Saskatchewan, Canada. Governing the Whitecap Indian Reserve No. 94, historically referred to as the Moose Woods Sioux Reserve, it is bordered by the Rural Municipality of Dundurn No. 314 and located along Highway 219 between the South Saskatchewan River and CFAD Dundurn.

Chief Wapahaska (White Cap) and his band eventually settled along the South Saskatchewan River, and received a  reserve in June 1881 despite not having signed a treaty. The First Nation has a registered population of 656 people as of March 2017; approximately 322 members of the First Nation live on-reserve and approximately 334 live off-reserve. The First Nation is led by Chief Darcy Bear and is affiliated with the Saskatoon Tribal Council.

The Dakota Dunes Casino is located on Whitecap Dakota First Nation.

Whitecap, Saskatchewan 
The unincorporated area of Whitecap is located within the Whitecap Dakota First Nation, located along Highway 219.

References

External links

Dakota
First Nations governments in Saskatchewan